Bavoryně is a municipality and village in Beroun District in the Central Bohemian Region of the Czech Republic. It has about 400 inhabitants.

Administrative parts
Hamlets of Na Lhotkách, Pod Průhony and U Vodojemu and the municipal part of Průmyslová zóna are administrative parts of Bavoryně.

Geography
It lies in the Hořovice Uplands. The Červený Stream flows through the municipality.

History
There was a Slavic settlement on the site of Bavoryně around 872, but it later disappeared. Bavoryně was then founded probably in the second half of the 11th century. The first written mention of Bavoryně is from 1088, under its old name Obryně. The name Bavoryně is used from the 13th century. From 1336 to 1437, the village was owned by the town of Beroun, then it was owned by various lower noblemen.

In 1850, Bavoryně became an administrative part of Zdice. From 1889, it was a separate municipality. In 1945–1948, the German-speaking population was expelled. From 1980 to 1990, it was again a part of Zdice, and since 1990, it has been separate.

Demographics

Economy
There is a small industrial zone in the territory.

Transport
The D5 motorway runs along the northern municipal border.

References

External links

Villages in the Beroun District